Edwardów may refer to the following places in Poland:
Edwardów, Lower Silesian Voivodeship (south-west Poland)
Edwardów, Biłgoraj County in Lublin Voivodeship (east Poland)
Edwardów, Ryki County in Lublin Voivodeship (east Poland)
Edwardów, Grójec County in Masovian Voivodeship (east-central Poland)
Edwardów, Kozienice County in Masovian Voivodeship (east-central Poland)
Edwardów, Radom County in Masovian Voivodeship (east-central Poland)